is a former Japanese football player and manager. He played for Japan national team. His younger brother Masato was also a footballer. He is currently manager of Kagoshima United.

Club career
Otake was educated at and played for Tokai University Daiichi High School and Juntendo University. After leaving the university, he joined the Japan Soccer League side All Nippon Airways in 1991. When Japan's first-ever professional league J1 League started in 1993, All Nippon Airways was transformed to Yokohama Flügels for whom he continued to play. The club won 1993 Emperor's Cup their first time in major title. In Asia, the club also won 1994–95 Asian Cup Winners' Cup. He moved to Kyoto Purple Sanga at the beginning of 1998 season and retired from the game as a Sanga player in 2001.

National team career
He was capped once for the Japanese national team when he played in a friendly against Australia on September 27, 1994 at the Tokyo National Stadium. He was also a member of the Japan team that won the 1992 Asian Cup but did not play in the tournament.

Coaching career
After retirement, Otake started coaching career at Kyoto Purple Sanga (later Kyoto Sanga FC) in 2002. Through Yokohama F. Marinos coach, He signed with L.League club Iga FC Kunoichi in 2010 and became a manager. He managed until 2012. In 2013, he moved to Giravanz Kitakyushu and coached until 2015. He returned to Kyoto Sanga FC in 2016 and coached until 2017. In 2018, he became a manager for Iga FC Kunoichi again. In 2022, he became a manager for J3 club, Kagoshima United.

Club statistics

National team statistics

Honours and awards

Team honours
 1992 Asian Cup (Champions)

References

External links

Japan National Football Team Database

1968 births
Living people
Juntendo University alumni
Association football people from Shizuoka Prefecture
Japanese footballers
Japan international footballers
Japan Soccer League players
J1 League players
J2 League players
Yokohama Flügels players
Kyoto Sanga FC players
Japanese football managers
1988 AFC Asian Cup players
1992 AFC Asian Cup players
AFC Asian Cup-winning players
Association football defenders
Footballers at the 1994 Asian Games
Asian Games competitors for Japan
J3 League managers
Kagoshima United FC managers